Johannes Kurvits (5 May 1894, in Kirepi Parish, Tartu County – 4 December 1941, in Turinsk, Sverdlovsk Oblast) was an Estonian politician. He was a member of VI Riigikogu (its National Council).

References

1894 births
1941 deaths
Estonian Socialist Workers' Party politicians
Members of the Riiginõukogu
20th-century Estonian politicians
Estonian military personnel of the Estonian War of Independence
Estonian people who died in Soviet detention
People who died in the Gulag
People from Elva Parish